Diospyros muricata is a tree in the family Ebenaceae. The twigs are covered with short hairs. Inflorescences bear up to seven flowers. The specific epithet  is from the Latin meaning "rough with short, hard points", referring to the fruits. Habitat is lowland mixed dipterocarp forests from sea level to  altitude. D. muricata is endemic to Borneo.

References

muricata
Plants described in 1933
Endemic flora of Borneo
Trees of Borneo